An Unsuitable Job for a Woman is the title of a detective novel by P. D. James and of a TV series of four dramas developed from that novel. It was published by Faber and Faber in the UK in 1972 and by Charles Scribner's Sons in the US.

The book features private detective Cordelia Gray, the protagonist of both this title and The Skull Beneath the Skin (1982). It is noted for introducing a new type of female detective at the start of the feminist era.

Plot summary

22-year-old private detective Cordelia Gray walks into the London office she shares with former police detective Bernie Pryde to find her partner has committed suicide. Pryde has left everything, including his unlicensed handgun, to Cordelia, who decides to keep the failing agency open out of gratitude. When she returns to her office from the funeral service, she is visited by her first client, Elizabeth Leaming, assistant to prominent scientist Sir Ronald Callender, whose son Mark recently hanged himself.

Cordelia travels to Cambridge, where Mark had left university and taken a job as gardener despite decent grades and the prospect of a considerable inheritance from his maternal grandfather. Her task is to discover the reason for Mark’s death but she begins to suspect foul play. She meets Mark's student friends, who are reluctant to talk and attempt to convince Cordelia that his death really was suicidal. 

Cordelia decides to move into the rundown cottage on the estate where Mark had worked. As she sifts through Mark's effects, trying to get a clearer picture of his life, she becomes ever more convinced that his death could not have been suicide. Repeatedly, friendly overtures from Mark's former companions try to lead her away from the investigation but Cordelia is determined to succeed in her first solo case. Returning to the cottage one night and finding an effigy hanging from the same hook on which Mark's body had been suspended convinces her that someone is trying to scare her off.

She finds out that a certain Nanny Pilbeam, formerly nanny to Mark's mother, had attended Mark's cremation and goes to question her. The old woman tells Cordelia that she went to see Mark at his college and gave him a Book of Common Prayer that his mother had wanted him to have when he turned 21. Cordelia finds the book in the cottage and discovers in it evidence that Lady Callender could not have been Mark's mother.

Back at the cottage the following night, someone attacks Cordelia, throws her down a well and replaces the cover. She is saved by a combination of her own resourcefulness and the good luck that the cottage owner notices the well has been tampered with. Cordelia in turn lies in wait with Bernie's gun in order to ambush her would-be killer. He turns out to be Sir Ronald's laboratory assistant, Lunn, who had been tailing her during her investigations. However, he escapes in his van, only to die in a collision with a truck. Certain now of her case, Cordelia continues to Sir Ronald's house, where Miss Leaming takes her gun from her and leads her to Sir Ronald. Cordelia privately accuses him of the murder of his son, which he defiantly admits, sure that nothing can be proved against him. Miss Leaming, however, who has overheard him, enters the office and shoots him with Cordelia's gun.

Miss Leaming confesses to Cordelia that she was Mark's true mother but was prevented from telling him by Sir Ronald. Lady Callender had been infertile and died shortly after Mark's birth. Sir Ronald had murdered Mark when he was close to discovering the truth, so as not to lose his wife's fortune. Cordelia sympathises with Miss Leaming and the two rearrange the crime scene to look like yet another suicide and it is accepted as such by the coroner. The case, however, is referred to Chief Superintendent Adam Dalgliesh, who had been Bernie Pryde’s commander originally and then sacked him. Word arrives during their interview that Leaming has been killed in a car crash, allowing Cordelia to maintain the fiction they concocted together. Dalgliesh admits to Cordelia, based on his observation of her abilities, that perhaps he had underrated Pryde. He also believes that he has worked out the true facts of the case, but in private conference with his superiors says there is little point in disturbing the official story in view of the social and international pressures on the police.

Cordelia returns resignedly to the agency and finds her next client waiting, a man who believes his 'lady friend' might be cheating on him.

Literary significance and criticism
The New York Times judged the book "A top-rated puzzle of peril that holds you all the way", whose characters "are anything but stereotypes," although "at the very end, things are a little too pat". Jacques Barzun, in a later supplement to his A Catalogue of Crime, however, thought it "barely passable".

Authors commenting on the introduction of the new type of female detective at the dawn of the feminist era noted the novel as a key pioneering work in which the focus is "at least as much on character and theme as…on crime". Another critic described it as "a political contribution to the recasting of the female detective mould", noting in particular how its heroine avenges a young man's murder by his father and connives in the murder in return of the father by the boy's mother in an act of feminine solidarity.

Film, TV or theatrical adaptations
The book has been twice adapted. The first adaptation, directed by Chris Petit, was released in UK cinemas in 1982, featuring Pippa Guard as Cordelia. It was financed and produced by Goldcrest Films/ The National Film Finance Corporation and Don Boyd.

A television series starring Helen Baxendale as Cordelia and Annette Crosbie as Edith Sparshott was made in 1997 and 2001, based in part upon the book.

References

1972 British novels
Novels by P. D. James
British novels adapted into films
Faber and Faber books
British novels adapted into television shows
British detective novels
Feminist novels